Elections in Washington may refer to:

 Elections in Washington (state)
 Elections in Washington, D.C.